Thembinkosi Brian Mthembu (born 31 July 1994), is a South African actor. He is best known for his roles in the popular serials The River, The Gamechangers, Kalushi: The Story of Solomon Mahlangu and a short film called  Ngeculo.

Personal life
He was born on 17 July 1994 in the village KwaNdengezi, Durban, South Africa. In 2017, he obtained a diploma in drama and production studios from Durban University of Technology.

Career
After completing the diploma, he moved to City of Gold in Johannesburg to pursue acting career. Then he worked at Checkers and Cell C as a dancer. During this period, he received the minor role 'Junior' in the television series The Republic. Then he appeared in the series The River with the role 'Mabutho' in the third season.

In 2019, he made a recurring role as 'Shift Manager' on the MTV Base drama series MTV ShugaL Down South 2.

Filmography

References

External links
 

Living people
South African male television actors
1994 births
South African male film actors
People from Durban